Dolichoderus lamellosus is a species of ant in the genus Dolichoderus. Described by Mayr in 1870, the species is endemic to many South American countries, including Argentina, Bolivia, Colombia, Costa Rica, Ecuador, French Guiana, Guyana, Honduras, Paraguay, Suriname and Venezuela.

References

Dolichoderus
Hymenoptera of North America
Hymenoptera of South America
Insects described in 1870